This is a list of German football transfers in the summer transfer window  2008  by club. Only transfers of the Bundesliga, 2. Bundesliga and 3. Liga are included.

Bundesliga

FC Bayern Munich

In:

Out:

Note: Flags indicate national team as has been defined under FIFA eligibility rules. Players may hold more than one non-FIFA nationality.

SV Werder Bremen

In:

Out:

FC Schalke 04

In:

Out:

Hamburger SV

In:

 

   

Out:

VfL Wolfsburg

In:

Out:

VfB Stuttgart

In:

Out:

Bayer 04 Leverkusen

In:

Out:

Hannover 96

In:

Out:

Eintracht Frankfurt

In:

Out:

Hertha BSC

In:

Out:

Karlsruher SC

In:

Out:

VfL Bochum

In:

Out:

Borussia Dortmund

In:

Out:

FC Energie Cottbus

In:

Out:

Arminia Bielefeld

In:

Out:

Borussia Mönchengladbach

In:

Out:

TSG 1899 Hoffenheim

In:

Out:

1. FC Köln

In:

Out:

Statistics
By Country

By League

2. Bundesliga

1. FC Nürnberg

In:

Out:

F.C. Hansa Rostock

In:

Out:

MSV Duisburg

In:

Out:

1. FSV Mainz 05

In:

Out:

SC Freiburg

In:

Out:

SpVgg Greuther Fürth

In:

Out:

Alemannia Aachen

In:

Out:

SV Wehen Wiesbaden

In:

Out:

FC St. Pauli

In:

Out:

TuS Koblenz

In:

Out:

TSV 1860 Munich

In:

Out:

VfL Osnabrück

In:

 

Out:

1. FC Kaiserslautern

In:

Out:

FC Augsburg

In:

Out:

Rot Weiss Ahlen

In:

Out:

Rot-Weiß Oberhausen

In:

Out:

FC Ingolstadt 04

In:

 

 

Out:

FSV Frankfurt

In:

Out:

See also
 2008–09 Bundesliga
 2008–09 2. Bundesliga
 List of German football transfers winter 2008-09

External links
 Official site of the DFB 
 kicker.de 
 Official site of the Bundesliga 
 Official site of the Bundesliga 

German
Trans
2008